USS Puget Sound has been the name of more than one ship of the United States Navy. These ships are named after Puget Sound in the state of Washington.

 The first commissioned  was an escort carrier in service for somewhat over a year, in 1945 and 1946.
 The second  was a destroyer tender in service from 1968 to 1996.

United States Navy ship names